Lost Tropics is the debut studio album by Australian rock band Ocean Alley, released on 13 May 2016. Following the album's release, the band completed an 8 week tour of Europe. The album was re-released in June 2021 for Record Store Day, which saw the album debut inside the ARIA top 100, at number 83.

Reception
Brian Winters from The Pier said "Lost Tropics, The band's first full-length rides on the heels of two successful, jam-packed EPs Yellow Mellow (2013) and In Purple (2015). Lost Tropics is Ocean Alley's effort to combine the raw, upbeat energy of Yellow Mellow with the dark, tantalizing sounds from In Purple."

Rolling Stone Magazine said "While the core of Ocean Alley's sun-soaked psych-reggae roots remain, Lost Tropics is a bold statement of confidence. The refined production tames the introduction of more experimental jazz, pop and prog elements... Ocean Alley craft a uniquely unforced balance between their unrestrained rock fusion and a pop directness"

Track listing

Charts

Release history

References 

2016 albums
Ocean Alley albums